Events from the year 1888 in Mexico.

Incumbents
President: Porfirio Díaz
Archbishop of Mexico: Pelagio Antonio de Labastida y Dávalos

Governors
 Aguascalientes: Alejandro Vázquez del Mercado
 Campeche: José Trinidad Ferrer/Onecíforo Durán/Joaquín Kerlegand
 Chiapas: Miguel Utrilla/Manuel Carrascosa
 Chihuahua: Lauro Carrillo
 Coahuila: José María Garza Galán
 Colima: Gildardo Gómez Campero
 Durango:  
 Guanajuato: 
 Guerrero: 
 Hidalgo: 
 Jalisco: Ramón Corona/Juan G. Robles/Pedro A. Galván
 State of Mexico:  
 Michoacán: 
 Morelos: Jesús H. Preciado
 Nuevo León: Lázaro Garza Ayala
 Oaxaca: 
 Puebla: 
 Querétaro: Francisco González de Cosío
 San Luis Potosí: Carlos Díez Gutiérrez
 Sinaloa: 
 Sonora: 
 Tabasco: 
 Tamaulipas:
 Tlaxcala: 	 
 Veracruz: Juan de la Luz Enríquez Lara
 Yucatán: General Guillermo Palomino
 Zacatecas:

Events

Births
May 3 – José María Robles Hurtado, Catholic priest
June 15 – Ramón López Velarde, poet
July 13 – Anacleto González Flores, lawyer

Deaths
 date unknown: Narciso Mendoza theNiño artillero (Child Gunner) during the Siege of Cuautla in 1812 (b. 1800)

References

 
Mexico
1880s in Mexico
Years of the 19th century in Mexico